The Harvard Depository, in Southborough, Massachusetts, is Harvard University's large-scale storage facility for books, documents, and special media (such as film and video). Opened in 1986 and expanded several times, it holds some 45% of the 16 million items held by Harvard's libraries, as well as non-library material such as archival records.

The Massachusetts Institute of Technology also uses the facility.

See also
Harvard Library
Library stack
New England Deposit Library

Sources
Beyond The Stacks

Boston Globe, "Harvard's paper cuts"
New York Times, "Shelf Space Gone, Harvard to Disperse Collection"
New York Times, "Harvard Law Library Readies Trove of Decisions for Digital Age"
New York Times, "Three Packed Libraries Seek Storage Space in New Jersey"
 
History and design

 +

External links
 

Harvard Library
Massachusetts Institute of Technology